Group A of the 2017 Africa Cup of Nations was played from 14 to 22 January 2017 in Gabon. The group consisted of hosts Gabon, Burkina Faso, Cameroon, and Guinea-Bissau.

Burkina Faso and Cameroon advanced to the round of 16 as the top two teams.

Teams

Notes

Standings

In the quarter-finals:
The group winners, Burkina Faso, advanced to play the runners-up of Group B, Tunisia.
The group runners-up, Cameroon, advanced to play the winners of Group B, Senegal.

Matches
All times are local, WAT (UTC+1).

Gabon vs Guinea-Bissau

Burkina Faso vs Cameroon

Gabon vs Burkina Faso

Cameroon vs Guinea-Bissau

Cameroon vs Gabon

Guinea-Bissau vs Burkina Faso

References

External links
2017 Africa Cup of Nations, CAFonline.com

Group A